Vargem Grande (Big Meadow) is a neighborhood in the West Zone of Rio de Janeiro, Brazil.

References

Neighbourhoods in Rio de Janeiro (city)